Shrule Castle is a ruined tower house near Shrule in County Mayo, Ireland. The castle was built c.1238, near the Black River at the County Mayo and County Galway border by the de Burgh family. It was given to John de Burgh in 1308 by his father Richard Óg de Burgh, 2nd Earl of Ulster.

History 
The castle was captured in 1570 by a strong force led by Sir Edward Fitton, President of Connaught and Vice Treasurer of Ireland, the force mainly consisted of the McDonnells of Knocknacloy's gallowglass warriors. Mac William Uachtar, Lord of Thomond, the de Burghs of Mayo and McDonnells of Mayo led a force to retake the castle, however they did not succeed. The chief of the McDonnells of Knocknacloy Calvagh McDonnell was killed on 18 June 1570 and during the battle Edward Fitton was unhorsed and severely wounded in the face.

William Burke occupied the castle, and passed it to his son John Burke in 1574. In 1610, Richard Burke, 4th Earl of Clanricarde leased the castle and lands to Pierce Lynch of Galway.

The tower house and its field are used to keep sheep now.

References
Shrule Castle
Shrule History

Castles in County Mayo
Ruins in the Republic of Ireland